The Cuban Embassy in Washington, D.C. is the diplomatic mission of Cuba to the United States of America. It is located at 2630 16th Street Northwest, in the Adams Morgan neighborhood. The building was originally constructed in 1917 as the Cuban embassy, and served in that capacity until the United States severed relations with Cuba in 1961.
On July 1, 2015, US President Barack Obama announced the formal restoration of diplomatic relations between the United States and Cuba. The building resumed its role as the Cuban Embassy on July 20, 2015.

History
From 1977 to 2015, the former Cuban Embassy housed the Cuban Interests Section in the United States. The interests section was staffed by Cubans and operated independently, but it was formally a section of the protecting power's embassy. From 1977 to 1991, it operated as the Cuba Interests Section of the Czechoslovak Embassy to the United States. In 1991, the post-Communist government of Czechoslovakia refused to continue its sponsorship of Cuba. From 1991 to 2015, the Cuban Interests Section operated under the Swiss Embassy, until diplomatic relations were re-established and the building resumed its role as the Cuban embassy.

On May 19, 1979, Omega 7 detonated a bomb in the building, which did more damage to the Lithuanian legation next door.

On April 30, 2020, a gunman opened fire at the building with an AK-47 style rifle. No one was injured, and the gunman, a 42-year-old man from Aubrey, Texas, was arrested. Though the gunman's motivation was not officially known, a police report called it a "suspected hate crime".

Designations since 1953

Note

Plenipotentiary representatives

Chiefs of Cuban Interests Section: 1977–2015
 1977–89: Ramón Sánchez-Parodi Montoto
 1989–92: José Antonio Arbesú
 1992–98: Alfonso Fraga
 1998–2001: Fernando Remírez de Estenoz Barciela
 2001–07: Dagoberto Rodríguez Barrera
 2007–12: Jorge Bolaños
 2012–15: José Ramón Cabañas Rodríguez

Ambassadors: 2015–present
 2015–2020: José Ramón Cabañas Rodríguez
 2020–present: Lianys Torres Rivera

See also
 Cuba–United States relations
 Interests Section of the Islamic Republic of Iran in the United States

References

External links
 Official website

Adams Morgan
Cuba–United States relations
Cuba
Washington, D.C.
1917 establishments in Washington, D.C.